Waveform shaping in electronics is the modification of the shape of an electronic waveform. It is in close connection with waveform diversity  and waveform design, which are extensively studied in signal processing. Shaping the waveforms
are of particular interest in active sensing (radar, sonar) for better detection performance, as well as communication schemes (CDMA, frequency hopping), and biology (for animal stimuli design).
 
See also Modulation, Pulse compression, Spread spectrum, Transmit diversity, Ambiguity function, Autocorrelation, and Cross-correlation.

Further reading
 Hao He, Jian Li, and Petre Stoica. Waveform design for active sensing systems: a computational approach. Cambridge University Press, 2012.
 Solomon W. Golomb, and Guang Gong. Signal design for good correlation: for wireless communication, cryptography, and radar. Cambridge University Press, 2005.
 M. Soltanalian. Signal Design for Active Sensing and Communications. Uppsala Dissertations from the Faculty of Science and Technology (printed by Elanders Sverige AB), 2014.
 Nadav Levanon, and Eli Mozeson. Radar signals. Wiley. com, 2004.
 Jian Li, and Petre Stoica, eds. Robust adaptive beamforming. New Jersey: John Wiley, 2006.
 Fulvio Gini, Antonio De Maio, and Lee Patton, eds. Waveform design and diversity for advanced radar systems. Institution of engineering and technology, 2012.
 Mark R. Bell, "Information theory and radar waveform design." IEEE Transactions on Information Theory, 39.5 (1993): 1578–1597.
 Robert Calderbank, S. Howard, and Bill Moran. "Waveform diversity in radar signal processing." IEEE Signal Processing Magazine, 26.1 (2009): 32–41.
 Augusto Aubry, Antonio De Maio, Bo Jiang, and Shuzhong Zhang. "Ambiguity function shaping for cognitive radar via complex quartic optimization." IEEE Transactions on Signal Processing 61 (2013): 5603–5619.
 John J. Benedetto, Ioannis Konstantinidis, and Muralidhar Rangaswamy. "Phase-coded waveforms and their design." IEEE Signal Processing Magazine, 26.1 (2009): 22–31.
 Mojtaba Soltanalian, and Petre Stoica. "Computational design of sequences with good correlation properties." IEEE Transactions on Signal Processing, 60.5 (2012): 2180–2193.
 Mohammad Mahdi Naghsh, M. Soltanalian, P. Stoica, M. Modarres-Hashemi, A. De Maio, and A. Aubry, "A Doppler Robust Design of Transmit Sequence and Receive Filter in the Presence of Signal-Dependent Interference", IEEE Transactions on Signal Processing,  62.4 (2014): 772–785.

References

Signal processing